Roby is an unincorporated community in northwestern Texas County, Missouri, United States. It is located approximately sixteen miles northwest of Houston and ten miles south of Fort Leonard Wood at the northern junction of Routes 17 and 32. Roby is home to the "Mark Twain National Forest" campgrounds.

A post office called Roby has been in operation since 1883. The community has the name of Cyrus H. Roby, who kept a store in the area.

References

Unincorporated communities in Texas County, Missouri
Unincorporated communities in Missouri